(Parliamentary) Committee on Justice (JuU) is a parliamentary committee in the Swedish Riksdag. The committee's main areas of responsibility concern Judiciary policies on various different authorities, among other things, the courts, Prosecution Authority, the Police Authorities, the Prison and Probation Service, along with matters that concern the criminal code, the Code of Judicial Procedure, and laws that replace or are closely related to regulations that concern these areas.

Since 2022, the chairman of the committee is Richard Jomshof of the Sweden Democrats and the deputy chairman of the committee is Ardalan Shekarabi of the Social Democrats.

List of speakers for the committee

List of vice-speakers for the committee

References

External links
Riksdag - Justitieutskottet Riksdag - Justice Committee

Committees of the Riksdag
Parliamentary committees on Justice